Andreas Arén (born 28 November 1985) is a Swedish ski jumper who has competed since 2003.

Born in Falun, Aren made his debut during the Ski Jumping World Cup meeting in Lahti. He finished in the 67th position and he didn't gain a single point. In the next season he didn't participate in the World Cup.
In the next year he participated in Continental Cup. In February he reached a second position in the Swedish Championship. 
During the Summer Grand Prix season his best performance was a 47th position in Kranj, on August 24, 2006. He also started in Oberhof, on October 3 but he was disqualified. 
In the 2006/07 Ski Jumping World Cup he reached the 17th position in Kuusamo on November 24, – which was his personal best – so he gained 14 points in the World Cup Overall classification.

References 

Swedish male ski jumpers
Aren andreas
Aren Andreas
People from Falun
Sportspeople from Dalarna County